Fresh Air was a cargo airline based in Ikeja, Lagos, Nigeria. It operated cargo charter services mainly within West Africa. Its main base was Murtala Mohammed International Airport, Lagos.

Code data 
ICAO Code: FRR
Callsign: FRESH AIR

History

Fleet 

As of March 2007 the Fresh Air fleet included:

1 Antonov An-12
1 Boeing 737-200
1 McDonnell Douglas DC-9-30

Popular culture
Fresh Air was the name of the fictional passenger airline in the 2005 Wes Craven film Red Eye starring Rachel McAdams.

References 

Defunct airlines of Nigeria
Airlines disestablished in 2007
Defunct companies based in Lagos
2007 disestablishments in Nigeria